PRRI may refer to:

 Public Religion Research Institute, an education and research organization based in Washington, D.C.
 Revolutionary Government of the Republic of Indonesia, an alternative government established in Sumatra to oppose the Indonesian national government